Sweethearts on Parade is a 1953 American drama film directed by Allan Dwan, written by Houston Branch, and starring Ray Middleton, Lucille Norman, Eileen Christy, Bill Shirley, Estelita Rodriguez and Clinton Sundberg. It was released on July 15, 1953, by Republic Pictures.

Plot

Cast      
Ray Middleton as Cam Ellerby
Lucille Norman as Kathleen Townsend
Eileen Christy as Sylvia Townsend Ellerby
Bill Shirley as Bill Gamble
Estelita Rodriguez as Lolita Lamont
Clinton Sundberg as Dr. Harold Wayne
Harry Carey, Jr. as Jim Riley, aka James Whitcomb Riley
Irving Bacon as Sheriff Doolittle
Leon Tyler as Tommy Wayne
Marjorie Wood as Wardrobe Woman
Mara Corday as Belle
Ann McCrea as Flo 
Tex Terry as Zebe
Emory Parnell as Mayor
George Bamby as Musician
The Republic Rhythm Riders as Musicians
Michael Barton as Musician 
Bud Dooley as Musician
Slim Duncan as Townsman 
Darol Rice as Musician

References

External links 
 

1953 films
American drama films
1953 drama films
Republic Pictures films
Films directed by Allan Dwan
Trucolor films
1950s English-language films
1950s American films